Ban Bossy is a self-censorship campaign launched in 2014 by LeanIn.org. The campaign criticizes the use of the word "bossy" to describe assertive girls and women, proposing that the word is stigmatizing and may discourage girls and women from seeking positions of leadership.

Promotion 
Sponsored primarily by Sheryl Sandberg, LeanIn.org and the Girl Scouts, the campaign features prominent bossy women and various sponsors urging people to pledge not to use the word.

Featured advocates who appear in Ban Bossy promotional material in addition to Sandberg include Jennifer Garner, Jane Lynch, Diane von Fürstenberg, Condoleezza Rice, Jimmie Johnson, Sinéad O'Connor, Arne Duncan, Anna Maria Chávez, Victoria Beckham, and Beyoncé, who stated "leadership is more important to boys than girls."

The campaign website also features training material designed for schools, teachers, parents and children to further the project.

Criticism 
The campaign has received criticism since its launch. Joan Rivers commented that she found the online movement to be "so stupid" and added, "I find it outrageous and I find it petty ... and I find we're so damn uptight in this country that this whole country is being divided." Phil Mason has drawn parallels between the banning of words and authoritarianism, observing that telling people what words they can or cannot use is inherently bossy.

In The New Yorker, Margaret Talbot criticized the campaign itself as bossy and instead suggested reclaiming the word, much as has been done for "nerd" and "queer".

References

External links 
 
 YouTube:Ban Bossy—I'm not bossy, I'm the boss

2010s in the United States
Anti-bullying campaigns
Self-censorship
Public awareness campaigns
Public service announcements of the United States
Censorship in the United States
First Amendment to the United States Constitution
American advertising slogans
2014 neologisms